Cause of Death is the second album by American death metal band Obituary. It was released on September 19, 1990. Cause of Death is considered a classic album in the history of death metal. The artwork was done by artist Michael Whelan. It is their first release with longtime member Frank Watkins on bass, and also their first and only album with guitarist James Murphy, previously of the group Death. Murphy did not contribute to the songwriting as the riffs he showed to the band would end up appearing on Disincarnate's Dreams of the Carrion Kind.

The cover art of this album was used in an H. P. Lovecraft collection, Lovecraft's Nightmare A. It was supposed to be the cover of Sepultura's album Beneath the Remains which release year before Cause of Death, Roadrunner Records send the original album cover of Beneath the Remains to Obituary. Monte Conner of Roadrunner forced Sepultura to use another Michael Whelan illustration for Beneath the Remains, Nightmare in Red. The second portion of the painting, Lovecraft's Nightmare B was used by Demolition Hammer for their 1992 album Epidemic of Violence. The incident with Sepultura led to Igor Cavalera become upset with Monte Conner, with Cavalera notably having a tattoo of the cover on his arm.

Obituary played Cause of Death in its entirety at the 2019 Decibel Metal & Beer Fest in Philadelphia, Pennsylvania.

Cause of Death contains a cover of Celtic Frost's "Circle of the Tyrants". Celtic Frost frontman Tom G. Warrior has since endorsed the cover.

Touring
Obituary went on tour in the United States to support Cause of Death in November 1990 together with label mates Sepultura as headliner and Sadus, starting in Florida. They continued their tour activities in Europe in mid-1991.

Track listing

Personnel

Obituary
 John Tardy – vocals
 James Murphy – lead guitar
 Trevor Peres – rhythm guitar
 Frank Watkins – bass
 Donald Tardy – drums

Technical personnel
 Obituary – production
 Scott Burns – production, engineering, mixing
 Jeff Daniel – 1997 reissue production
 George Marino – 1997 remastering
 Ponkiesbergh – 1997 design
 Kent Smith – sound effects
 Michael R. Whelan – cover, illustration
 Rob Mayworth – band logo design
 Carole Segal – back cover photo
 Shaun Clark – 1997 photo
 Tim Hubbard – 1997 photo
 Phil Alexander – 1997 liner notes

References 

1990 albums
Obituary (band) albums
Roadrunner Records albums
Albums produced by Scott Burns (record producer)
Albums recorded at Morrisound Recording
Albums with cover art by Michael Whelan